Cheilea equestris is a species of small limpet-like sea snail, a marine gastropod mollusk in the family Hipponicidae, the hoof snails.

The subgenus Cheilea equestris striata Nowell-Usticke, 1959 is a synonym of Cheilea striata Nowell-Usticke, 1959

Distribution
This marine species has a wide distribution: Colombia to Northeast Brazil; Mexico to Chile;in the Indo-Pacific; off Western Africa

Description 
The maximum recorded shell length is 38 mm.

Habitat 
Minimum recorded depth is 0 m. Maximum recorded depth is 780 m.

References

 Drivas, J.; Jay, M. (1987). Coquillages de La Réunion et de l'Île Maurice. Collection Les Beautés de la Nature. Delachaux et Niestlé: Neuchâtel. . 159 pp

External links
 

Hipponicidae
Gastropods described in 1758
Taxa named by Carl Linnaeus